New York's 23rd State Assembly district is one of the 150 districts in the New York State Assembly in the United States. It has been represented by Democrat Stacey Pheffer Amato since 2017.

Geography 
District 23 is located in Queens, comprising the neighborhoods of Broad Channel, Howard Beach, and parts of the Rockaways and Ozone Park.

Recent election results

2022

2020

2018

2016

2014

2012

References 

23